Group B of the men's football tournament at the 2016 Summer Olympics was played from 4 to 10 August 2016, and included Colombia, Japan, Nigeria and Sweden. The top two teams advanced to the knockout stage.

All times are BRT (UTC−3). For matches in Manaus, which is in AMT (UTC−4), local times are listed in parentheses.

Teams

Standings

Matches

Sweden vs Colombia

Nigeria vs Japan

Sweden vs Nigeria

Japan vs Colombia

Japan vs Sweden

Colombia vs Nigeria

References

External links
Football – Men, Rio2016.com
Men's Olympic Football Tournament, Rio 2016, FIFA.com

Group B